Dolní Nivy is a municipality and village in Sokolov District in the Karlovy Vary Region of the Czech Republic. It has about 300 inhabitants.

Administrative parts
Villages of Boučí, Horní Nivy and Horní Rozmyšl are administrative parts of Dolní Nivy.

References

Villages in Sokolov District